Masterton railway station is a single-platform, urban railway station serving the town of Masterton in New Zealand's Wairarapa district. Located at the end of Perry Street, it is one of three stations in Masterton, the others being Renall Street and Solway. Masterton station is the terminus for Wairarapa Connection passenger services on Metlink's Wairarapa Line from and to Wellington. The average journey time to Wellington is one hour and forty-three minutes.

The station building has a ticket office and café; the yard has working freight-handling facilities, a goods shed, a turntable, and engine/railcar shed.

History 
The original Masterton station was erected in 1880 and included a goods shed, sheep and cattle yards, and an engine shed with coal and water facilities.  In 1894 a windmill and pump were installed to improve the supply of water for locomotive and station use.  In 1897 a turntable was installed, and in 1902 the station was refurbished, which included the addition of refreshment rooms.  In 1954 a new  turntable was installed, followed two years later by a railcar shed.

Following the introduction of diesel-electric locomotives in 1955, the engine shed was used by the Way and Works Branch until it became surplus and was demolished.  But the water tanks remained in place until their removal in November 1968.

In 1965 a new freight yard and goods shed were established to the west of the original one, followed by the September 1967 opening of a new station building (the present-day structure).  The sheep and cattle yards were removed in August 1969.

Services 
In its early years the Napier Express passed through Masterton station before being re-routed along the west coast when the Wellington and Manawatu Railway Company's line was purchased in December 1908.  Later, Masterton was a through station for passenger services between Palmerston North/Woodville and Wellington, such as the steam-era Wairarapa Mail and subsequent services operated by NZR RM class Wairarapa, Standard, and 88 seater railcars.  But because of insufficient patronage, through trains between Palmerston North and Masterton officially ceased on Monday, 1 August 1988, with the last services running on Friday, 29 July 1988.

Presently the only passenger services with scheduled stops at this station are those of the Wairarapa Connection, which operates between Wellington and Masterton.  There are five such services both ways Monday to Thursday, six services on Fridays, and two services each way on Saturdays and Sundays.  There are also a number of weekday freight services to/from Wellington, usually to the Juken Nissho timber mill just south at Waingawa with the locomotive regularly turned on the turntable. Previously a Sunday service existed between Wellington and Palmerston North via Masterton, but has been discontinued.

Gallery

References

Further reading

External links
 Passenger service timetables from Metlink.

Masterton
Public transport in the Wellington Region
Rail transport in Wellington
Railway stations in New Zealand
Railway stations opened in 1880
Buildings and structures in the Wairarapa